Petar Bajić (born 8 July 1934) is a Yugoslav former sports shooter. He competed in the 50 metre pistol event at the 1972 Summer Olympics.

References

1934 births
Living people
Yugoslav male sport shooters
Olympic shooters of Yugoslavia
Shooters at the 1972 Summer Olympics
Place of birth missing (living people)